The 2009 All-Pacific-10 Conference football team consists of American football players chosen by various organizations for All-Pacific-10 Conference teams for the 2009 Pacific-10 Conference football season. The Oregon Ducks won the conference, posting an 8–1 conference record. Oregon then lost to the Big Ten champion Ohio State Buckeyes in the Rose Bowl 26 to 17. Stanford running back Toby Gerhart was voted Pac-10 Offensive Player of the Year. UCLA defensive tackle Brian Price was voted Pat Tillman Pac-10 Defensive Player of the Year.

Offensive selections

Quarterbacks
Sean Canfield, Oregon St. (Coaches-1, ESPN-1)
Jeremiah Masoli, Oregon (Coaches-2)

Running backs
Toby Gerhart#, Stanford (Coaches-1, ESPN-1)
Jacquizz Rodgers, Oregon St. (Coaches-1, ESPN-1)
LaMichael James, Oregon (Coaches-2, ESPN-1)
Jahvid Best, California (Coaches-2)

Wide receivers
James Rodgers, Oregon St. (Coaches-1, ESPN-1)
Damian Williams, USC (Coaches-1, ESPN-1)
Chris McGaha, Arizona St. (Coaches-2)
Jermaine Kearse, Washington (Coaches-2)

Tight ends
Ed Dickson, Oregon (Coaches-1, ESPN-1)
Jim Dray, Stanford (Coaches-2)

Tackles
Chris Marinelli, Stanford (Coaches-1, ESPN-1)
Charles Brown, USC (Coaches-1, ESPN-1)
Mike Tepper, California (Coaches-1)
Adam Grant, Arizona (Coaches-2)

Guards
Jeff Byers, USC (Coaches-1, ESPN-1)
Gregg Peat, Oregon St. (Coaches-1, ESPN-1)
Shawn Lauvao, Arizona St. (Coaches-2)

Centers
Kenny Alfred, Washington St. (Coaches-2, ESPN-1)
Colin Baxter, Arizona (Coaches-2)
Chase Beeler, Stanford (Coaches-2)

Defensive selections

Ends
Tyson Alualu, California (Coaches-1, ESPN-1)
Daniel Te'o-Nesheim, Washington (Coaches-2, ESPN-1)
Dexter Davis, Arizona St. (Coaches-1)
Everson Griffen, USC (Coaches-2)
Earl Mitchell, Arizona (Coaches-2)
Will Tukuafu, Oregon (Coaches-2)

Tackles
Brian Price#, UCLA (Coaches-1, ESPN-1)
Stephen Paea, Oregon St. (Coaches-1, ESPN-1)

Linebackers
Keaton Kristick, Oregon St. (Coaches-1, ESPN-1)
Mike Mohamed, California (Coaches-1, ESPN-1)
Donald Butler, Washington (Coaches-2, ESPN-1)
Reggie Carter, UCLA (Coaches-1)
Xavier Kelly, Arizona (Coaches-2)
Casey Matthews, Oregon (Coaches-2)

Cornerbacks
Alterraun Verner, UCLA (Coaches-1, ESPN-1)
Trevin Wade, Arizona (Coaches-2, ESPN-1)
Syd'Quan Thompson, California (Coaches-1)
Josh Pinkard, USC (Coaches-2)
Kevin Thomas, USC (Coaches-2)

Safeties
Rahim Moore, UCLA (Coaches-1, ESPN-1)
Taylor Mays, USC (Coaches-1, ESPN-1)
Cam Nelson, Arizona (Coaches-2)

Special teams

Placekickers
Kai Forbath#, UCLA (Coaches-1, ESPN-1)
Jordan Williamson, Stanford (Coaches-2)

Punters
Bryan Anger, California (Coaches-1)
Trevor Hankins, Arizona St. (ESPN-1)
Jeff Locke, UCLA (Coaches-2)

Return specialists 
Chris Owusu, Stanford (Coaches-1)
Damian Williams, USC (Coaches-1)
Terence Austin, UCLA (Coaches-2)
Kyle Williams, Arizona St. (Coaches-2)

Special teams player
Suaesi Tuimaunei, Oregon St. (Coaches-1)
Garrett Green, USC (Coaches-2)

Key
Coaches = selected by Pac-12 coaches

ESPN = selected by ESPN.com staff

# = unanimous selection by coaches

See also
2009 College Football All-America Team

References

All-Pacific-10 Conference Football Team
All-Pac-12 Conference football teams